Hall Bower is a small hamlet lying 2 miles (3.5 km) south of Huddersfield, West Yorkshire, England. 

It sits in the shadow of Castle Hill, just above the village of Newsome.

Sport
The hamlet has a team in the Huddersfield Cricket League, Hall Bower Cricket Club. Newsome Panthers Rugby League team now play in Hall Bower also, on fields near to the cricket ground.

.

References

External links

Hamlets in West Yorkshire
Geography of Huddersfield